The Coutumes of Beauvaisis is a book on medieval French law composed by Philippe de Beaumanoir at the end of the 13th century in Old French prose. The text covers a wide range of topics both on procedural and substantive law and is quite voluminous, which explains its attractiveness to scholars. The bibliography of the Coutumes is large, although it contains mostly articles and only few subject-specific books. The latest edition has been prepared by Amédée Salmon and was published back in 1899–1900, respecting the original old French syntax. It has not been put into modern French, but translations exist in English and Japanese.

Authorship
During a long period of time the author of the text had been falsely identified as poet Philippe de Rémi, bailli of the Gâtinais, who was renowned for his 20,000 verses of poems including La Manekine, Jehan et Blonde and Salut d’amour. As a result, in the 19th and at the beginning of 20th century Philippe de Rémi was usually described as a prominent person capable both in poetry and law.

However, it is now accepted that the author was the poet's son and namesake, jurist Philippe de Rémi.

References

Bibliography

Text and translations
 
Coutumes de Beauvaisis Tome 1 online on Gallica2
Coutumes de Beauvaisis Tome 2 online on Gallica2
 
 
Gaspard Thaumas de la Thaumassière, Coustumes de Beauvaisis (1690 edition) at the Internet Archive

Studies

Dictionaries and reference items
 
 

Medieval law
Customary legal systems
Legal history of France
Legal treatises